Nino Castelli,  (1897–1925) was an Italian rower. He competed in the men's single sculls event at the 1920 Summer Olympics.

"Nino" was just his nickname as the rowing fellows used to shorten his name this way when he arrived at Canottieri Lecco.

He also entered the Lecco Football Club when first founded in December 1908.

References

External links
 

1897 births
1925 deaths
Italian male rowers
Olympic rowers of Italy
Rowers at the 1920 Summer Olympics
Sportspeople from Lecco